Rajamahendravaram Central Prison is a prison located in Rajamahendravaram, Andhra Pradesh, India.

History 
In 1602, the Dutch constructed a fort in Rajamahendravaram. The British empire converted it into a jail in 1864, and then elevated it to a central jail in 1870. The jail is spread over  out of which the buildings occupy .

In 2012, a few lawmakers proposed shifting of the jail from its present location to a new site in Jaggampeta. As per the proposal, the existing property was to be utilised for public amenities. 20 acres of land was towards construction of a sport stadium, 120 acres for the new campus of Nannayya University, and rest of the land going towards providing housing for the poor. This proposal met with criticism from other lawmakers that represented this region.

Facilities 
The jail trains the convicts in making furniture and other crafts. In 2008, it was reported that the jail improved the literacy rate of its inmates. About 240 prisoners graduated from prison. The prison administration offers vocational courses and legal services to the prisoners. The inmates are allowed to sell fruits and vegetables while serving their time. On one occasion, they raised  through the sale proceeds.

In 2011, the University Grants Commission and a regional Gandhian Studies Centre began offering a three-month certificate course in Gandhian philosophy to the male prisoners of the jail. During the launch of this course, the jail authorities said that they placed priority on educating the prisoners. The jail also offers the opportunity for further education through the Andhra Pradesh Open University.

To improve the facilities at this prison, the central government sanctioned  for the renovation of central jail using funds from the thirteenth Finance Commission (2010—2015). The funds were planned to be utilised towards construction of a kitchen, a 100-bed hospital, barracks, and workshops.

See also 
 Department of Prisons of Government of Andhra Pradesh

References 

Prisons in Andhra Pradesh
Buildings and structures in Rajahmundry
1864 establishments in India